The red pill and blue pill represent a choice between the willingness to learn a potentially unsettling or life-changing truth by taking the red pill or remaining in the contented experience of ordinary reality with the blue pill. The terms originate from the 1999 film The Matrix.

In The Matrix 

In the film The Matrix, the main character Neo (played by Keanu Reeves) is offered the choice between a red pill and a blue pill by rebel leader Morpheus (played by Laurence Fishburne). Morpheus says "You take the blue pill... the story ends, you wake up in your bed and believe whatever you want to believe. You take the red pill... you stay in Wonderland, and I show you how deep the rabbit hole goes." It is implied that the blue pill is a sedative that would cause Neo to think that all his most recent experiences were a hallucination, so that he can go back to living in the Matrix's simulated reality. The red pill, on the other hand, serves as a "location device" to locate the subject's body in the real world and to prepare them to be "unplugged" from the Matrix.

Neo takes the red pill and awakens in the real world, where he is forcibly ejected from the liquid-filled chamber in which he has obliviously been lying. After his rescue and convalescence aboard Morpheus's ship, Morpheus shows him the true nature of the Matrix: a detailed computer simulation of Earth at the end of the 20th century (the actual year, though not known for sure, is suggested within the original movie to be approximately 200 years later, though it is revealed through sequels The Matrix Reloaded, The Matrix Revolutions and The Animatrix that at least 700 years have passed). It has been created to keep the minds of humans docile while their bodies are stored in massive power plants, their body heat and bioelectricity consumed as power by the sentient machines that have enslaved them.

Later Matrix films
In a 2012 interview, Lana Wachowski said:

In the 2021 film The Matrix Resurrections, the Analyst uses blue pills to keep Neo's true memories suppressed in the guise of therapy sessions. Later, Neo takes another red pill before being freed from the Matrix once again by Bugs and her crew. In Trinity's case, she does not have to take the red pill again because of the way that Sati is freeing her from the Matrix. The red pills also allow friendly programs to leave the Matrix, as seen with the program version of Morpheus.

Analysis

An essay written by Russell Blackford discusses the red and blue pills, questioning whether if a person were fully informed they would take the red pill, opting for the real world, believing that the choice of physical reality over a digital simulation is not so beneficial as to be valid for all people. Both Neo and another character, Cypher (Joe Pantoliano), take the red pill over the blue pill, though later in the first Matrix film, the latter demonstrates regret for having made that choice, saying that if Morpheus fully informed him of the situation, Cypher would have told him to "shove the red pill right up [his] ass." When Cypher subsequently makes a deal with the machines to return to the Matrix and forget everything he had learned, he says, "Ignorance is bliss." Blackford argues that the Matrix films set things up so that even if Neo fails, the taking of the red pill is worthwhile because he lives and dies authentically. Blackford and science-fiction writer James Patrick Kelly feel that The Matrix stacks the deck against machines and their simulated world.

Matrix Warrior: Being the One author Jake Horsley compared the red pill to LSD, citing a scene where Neo forms his own world outside of the Matrix. When he asks Morpheus if he could return, Morpheus responds by asking him if he would want to. Horsley also describes the blue pill as addictive, calling The Matrix series a continuous series of choices between taking the blue pill and not taking it. He adds that the habits and routines of people inside the Matrix are merely the people dosing themselves with the blue pill. While he describes the blue pill as a common thing, he states that the red pill is one of a kind, and something someone may not even find.

Literary and philosophical allusions

The Matrix, and its sequels, contain numerous references to Lewis Carroll's 1865 novel Alice's Adventures in Wonderland and its 1872 sequel Through the Looking-Glass. The Alice in Wonderland metaphor is made explicit in Morpheus's speech to Neo, with the phrases "white rabbit" and "down the rabbit hole", as well as the description of Neo's path of discovery as "Wonderland". The concept of the red and blue pills has also been speculated to be a reference to the scene in Alice in Wonderland where Alice finds a cake labelled "Eat Me" and a potion labelled "Drink Me": eating the cake makes Alice grow to an enormous size, while drinking the potion makes her tiny.

The Matrix also makes references to historical myths and philosophy, including gnosticism, existentialism, and nihilism. The central concept of the film has been compared to Plato's Allegory of the Cave, Zhuangzi's "Zhuangzi dreamed he was a butterfly", René Descartes's skepticism and evil demon, Kant's reflections on the Phenomenon versus the Ding an sich, Robert Nozick's "experience machine", the concept of a simulated reality and the brain in a vat thought experiment.

The Wachowskis asked star Keanu Reeves to read three books before filming: Simulacra and Simulation (1981) by Jean Baudrillard, Out of Control (1992) by Kevin Kelly, and Introducing Evolution (1999) by Dylan Evans.

Red pill as transgender allegory  
Fan theories have suggested that the red pill may represent an allegory for transgender people or a story of Lana and Lilly Wachowski's history as coming out as transgender. During the 1990s, a common male-to-female transgender hormone therapy involved Premarin, a maroon tablet. Lilly Wachowski stated in August 2020 that the filmmakers had intentionally included transgender themes in the film.

As political metaphor 
The concept of red and blue pills has since been widely used as a political metaphor, especially among libertarians and conservatives in the United States, where "taking the red pill" or being "red-pilled" means becoming aware of the political biases inherent in society, including in the mainstream media, and becoming an independent thinker; while "taking the blue pill" or being "blue-pilled" means unquestioningly accepting these supposed biases.

The concept is also used among leftists to refer to members of the alt-right and others who subscribe to extremist right wing beliefs or conspiracy theories.

The first known political use of this metaphor was in the 2006 essay "The Red Pill" by University of Colorado sociology professor Kathleen J. Tierney, in which she argued that those who felt that the U.S. government had a poor response to Hurricane Katrina should "take the red pill" and realize that "post-September 11 policies and plans have actually made the nation more vulnerable, both to natural disasters and to future terrorist attacks."

The metaphor has been popularized by neo-reactionary blogger Curtis Yarvin. He first used it in a 2007 blog post (writing under the pseudonym Mencius Moldbug) titled "The Case Against Democracy: Ten Red Pills", in which he argues that trying to convince a Westerner that democracy is bad is like trying to convince "a Catholic in 16th-century Spain... to stop believing in Catholicism", but then offers ten "red pill" arguments (along with their "blue pill" counterparts) to make the case against democracy.

The choice between taking a blue or red pill is a central metaphor in the 2011 Arte documentary film Marx Reloaded, in which philosophers including Slavoj Žižek and Nina Power explore solutions to the global economic and financial crisis of 2008–2009. The film also contains an animated parody of the red/blue pill scene in The Matrix, with Leon Trotsky as Morpheus and Karl Marx as Neo.

In some parts of the men's rights movement and the manosphere, the term "red pill" is used as a metaphor for the specific moment when they come to the belief that certain gender roles they are expected to conform to, such as marriage and monogamy, are intended to solely benefit women, rather than for mutual benefit. In 2016, a documentary titled The Red Pill was released, which deals with the men's rights movement.

In 2017, political activist and commentator Candace Owens launched Red Pill Black, a website and YouTube channel that promotes black conservatism in the United States. The term is used as a metaphor for the process of rejection of previously believed leftist narratives.

In May 2020, Elon Musk tweeted "Take the red pill", agreeing with a Twitter user that it meant taking a "free-thinking attitude and waking up from a normal life of sloth and ignorance". Ivanka Trump retweeted this, stating "Taken!" Lilly Wachowski, a director of The Matrix, responded to this exchange with "Fuck both of you".

Black pill and white pill
The metaphor of the "black pill" was first popularized by the incel-related blog Omega Virgin Revolt. In this parlance, being red-pilled means recognizing social realities like male oppression and biological realities like female hypergamy, while being black-pilled means believing that there is little that low-status or unattractive men can do to improve their prospects with women.

This metaphor was extended to political matters, where, after becoming red-pilled (recognizing, and then rejecting, the dominant political narratives), one can then become black-pilled (being resigned to the view that these narratives will forever hold), or white-pilled (believing that forces like the internet will lead to more independent thought.) This metaphor has been embraced by commentators including the anarchist Michael Malice, whose 2022 book The White Pill advocates the latter point of view.

Other uses 

 In the 2004 book The Art of the Start, author Guy Kawasaki uses the red pill as an analog to the situation of leaders of new organizations, in that they face the same choice to either live in reality or fantasy. He adds that if they want to be successful, they have to take the red pill and see how deep the rabbit hole goes.
 Until they were removed from the Maemo operating system application installer in January 2010, certain advanced features were unlocked by a "Red Pill Mode" Easter egg to prevent accidental use by novice users but make them readily available to experienced users. This was activated by starting to add a catalog whose URL was "matrix" and then choosing to cancel. A dialog box would appear asking "Which pill?" with the choices "Red" or "Blue", allowing the user to enter red pill mode. In "Red Pill" mode, the installer allows the user to view and reconfigure system packages whose existence it normally does not acknowledge. In Blue Pill mode the installer displays only software installed by a user, creating the illusion that system software does not exist on the system.
 In the 2013 movie version of The Secret Life of Walter Mitty, when Ben Stiller's character lands at Nuuk in Greenland, he asks the man in the airport booth: "Do you have any cars available?" "Yeah, we have a blue one and a red one", the man replies. "I'll take the red one", says Walter. This is also "the final scene in the trailer: a quirky and charming sequence on its own, even before you recognize the built-in riff on the famous "Red/Blue Pill" exchange from The Matrix". "The choice between the red and blue car at the rental car lot is worthy of mention, if only because it almost candidly pulls the idea from the red pill of The Matrix. Two jelly bean, or pill, shaped cars , red and blue; the only thing missing is Lawrence  Fishburne working the counter". "The passage connecting reality to illusion is often visualised using tangible things and physical environments [as] Neo took the red pill in The Matrix."

See also 

 Candide
 Denialism
 Epiphany
 Hyperreality
 
 Malo periculosam libertatem quam quietum servitium
 Páthei máthos
 Quid est veritas
 Reality principle
 /r/TheRedPill
 The Social Construction of Reality

References 

1999 neologisms
2010s slang
Catchphrases
Dilemmas
Fiction about amnesia
Film and television memes
Internet memes introduced in 2010
Manosphere
Metaphors
Philosophical analogies
Film scenes
Science fiction catchphrases
Science fiction terminology
The Matrix (franchise)
Thought experiments in philosophy